C. nanus may refer to:
 Cercartetus nanus, the eastern pygmy possum, a marsupial species found in south-eastern Australia
 Cerion nanus, an air-breathing land snail species
 Choristotanyderus nanus, an extinct protodipteran insect species living in the Permian period
 Cisticola nanus, the tiny cisticola, a bird species found in Ethiopia, Kenya, Somalia and Sudan
 Colobocarpos nanus, a plant species native to Laos and Northern Thailand
 Corydoras nanus, a tropical freshwater fish species

See also
 Nanus (disambiguation)